The 2013 Tour of Zhoushan Island was a women's cycle stage race held in China from 16 to 18 May 2013. The tour has an UCI rating of 2.2. The race was eventually won by Giorgia Bronzini, marking  first general classification victory.

Stages

Stage 1
16 May Shengsi to Shengsi

Stage 2
17 May Daishan to Daishan

Stage 3
18 May Zhujiajian to Zhujiajian

Classification leadership

References

External links

Tour of Zhoushan Island
Tour of Zhoushan Island
Tour of Zhoushan Island